Beeck is a German surname. People with the name include:

 Ana Teresa Velázquez Beeck (born 1982), Mexican politician
 Christian Beeck (born 1971), German football (soccer) player
 Jens Beeck (born 1969), German politician
 Marcus Beeck (1923–1986), Australian businessman
 Oliver Beeck (born 1988), American football player
 Zach Beeck (born 1982), Australian rules football player

See also
 Van Beek
 Van der Beek